Kusaka no Hatabi no hime (? – after 457) was Empress of Japan as the consort of Emperor Yūryaku.

Daughter of Emperor Nintoku.

Notes

Japanese empresses
Year of death missing
Japanese princesses
5th-century Japanese women